Brachychiton velutinosus is a species of flowering plant in the family Malvaceae. It is found in Australia and Papua New Guinea. It is threatened by habitat loss.

Notes

References

velutinosus
Flora of Papua New Guinea
Malvales of Australia
Vulnerable flora of Australia
Nature Conservation Act rare biota
Vulnerable biota of Queensland
Rare flora of Australia
Flora of Queensland
Taxonomy articles created by Polbot